Jyestha or Jyeṣṭhāryā (9th-century), was a queen regnant of Sambhupura Chenla in Cambodia.

She was the daughter of queen Jayaendra[valla]bha or Jayendrabhā of Sambhupura and king Jayavarman II (r. 780-824), and half sister of king Jayavarman III (r. 834-877), who was the sone of Jayavarman II by Dharanindradevi.  An inscription describes her as ‘the elder daughter of kanhen kamratan an Sri Jayendra[valla]bha, granddaughter of kanhen kamratan an Sri Nrpendradevi, great-granddaughter of vrah kamratan an Sri Indraloka’.

Jyestha, daughter of queen Jayaendra[valla]bha of Sambhupura, is attested as queen in 803.  She appears to have inherited the throne from her mother, who had in turn inherited the throne from her mother, queen Nrpendradevi. It appears she ruled in cooperation with her father.  After her death, the throne appears to have been inherited by her brother Jayavarman III, uniting Cambodia. 

As monarch queen Jyestha formed the basis of a funerary cult; in 895 an emissary of the court noted in a matter concerning some slaves, that they were part of the property belonging to ‘the vrah kamraten an, the lady Jyestha’. 

In the 9th-century, the capital of the new united Cambodia was relocated to the new city of Angkor Wat by king Yaśovarman I (r. 889–912), and there are no inscriptions noting any autonomously ruling female monarchs during the Khmer Empire.  Queen Jyeṣṭhāryā may therefore have been the last female monarch in Cambodia until Queen Tey in the 17th-century.

References

Cambodian Hindus
9th-century Cambodian monarchs
9th-century women rulers
9th-century Cambodian women
Chenla